is a Japanese football player who plays for German club SV Straelen.

Career
Toshiaki Miyamoto joined J1 League club Kashiwa Reysol in 2017.

Club statistics
Updated to end of 2018 season.

References

External links
Profile at Kashiwa Reysol

1999 births
Living people
Association football people from Chiba Prefecture
Japanese footballers
Association football defenders
Kashiwa Reysol players
Montedio Yamagata players
SV 19 Straelen players
J1 League players
J2 League players
Regionalliga players
Japanese expatriate footballers
Expatriate footballers in Germany
Japanese expatriate sportspeople in Germany